John Clyde Oswald (July 11, 1872 – June 22, 1938) was an author, president of the National Arts Club, and the editor of The American Printer  magazine. His book, Printing in the Americas, identifies the major events in each state "so as to suggest the distinctive character of the printers" is recognized as a primary source for research on early printing in the United States.

Publications
Benjamin Franklin, Printer (1917)
Printing in the Americas (1937)
Benjamin Franklin in Oil and Bronze
A History of Printing

References

External link

1872 births
1938 deaths